The list of ships of the Imperial German Navy includes all ships commissioned into service with the Imperial German Navy (Kaiserliche Marine) of Germany, covering the period from 1871, the creation of the German Empire, through to the end of the Empire in 1918.

Capital ships

Ironclad warships 

 Arminius class
 , 1864
 Prinz Adalbert class (1,560 tons, 5 x 36pdr guns)
 , 1865
 Kronprinz
 , 1867
 Friedrich Carl class
 , 1867
 König Wilhelm class, (9,750 tons, 33 x 72pdr guns)
 , 1868
 Hansa class
 , 1872
  (6,800 tons)
 , 1873
 , 1874
 , 1875
  (7,319 tons, 8 x 26 cm guns)
 , 1875
 , 1875
  (7,800 tons, 6 x 26 cm guns)
 , 1877
 , 1878
 , 1878
 , 1880
 Oldenburg class (5,250 tons, 8 x 24 cm guns)
 , 1884

Coastal defense ships 

  (3,700 tons, 3 x 24 cm guns)
 , 1889
 , 1890
 , 1892
 , 1892
 , 1892
 , 1893
  (4,250 tons, 3 x 24 cm guns)
 , 1894
 , 1895

Battleships 

Pre-Dreadnoughts
  (10,500 tons, 6 x 28 cm guns)
 , 1891
 , 1891
 , 1891
 , 1892
  (11,600 tons, 4 x 24 cm guns)
 , 1896
 , 1897
 , 1899
 , 1899
 , 1900
  (12,000 tons, 4 x 24 cm guns)
 , 1900
 , 1900
 , 1901
 , 1901
 , 1901
  (13,000 tons, 4 x 28 cm guns)
 , 1901
 , 1903
 , 1903
 , 1903
 , 1904
  (13,000 tons, 4 x 28 cm guns)
 , 1904
 , 1905
 , 1905
 , 1906
 , 1906

Dreadnoughts
Main dreadnought classes

  (19,000 tons, 12 x 28 cm guns)
 , 1908
 , 1908
 , 1908
 , 1908
  (23,000 tons, 12 x 30.5 cm guns)
 , 1909
 , 1909
 , 1909
 , 1910
  (25,000 tons, 10 x 30.5 cm guns)
 , 1911
 , 1911
 , 1911
 , 1911
 , 1912
  (26,000 tons, 10 x 30.5 cm guns)
 , 1913
 , 1913
 , 1913
 , 1914
  (29,000–32,000 tons, 8 x 38 cm guns)
 , 1915
 , 1915
 , not completed
 , not completed
  (43,800–48,700 tons, 8 x 42 cm guns)
 None built

Battlecruisers 

 Von der Tann class (19,400 tons, 8 x 28 cm guns)
 , 1909
  (23,000 tons, 10 x 28 cm guns)
 , 1910
 , 1911
 Seydlitz class (25,000 tons, 10 x 28 cm guns)
 , 1912
  (27,000 tons, 8 x 30.5 cm guns)
 , 1913
 , 1913
 , 1915
  (35,000 tons, 8 x 35 cm guns)
 SMS Mackensen not completed
 SMS Graf Spee not completed
 SMS Prinz Eitel Friedrich not completed
 SMS Fürst Bismarck, not completed
  (38,000 tons 8 x 38 cm guns)
 SMS Ersatz Yorck not completed
 SMS Ersatz Gneisenau ordered but construction not started
 SMS Ersatz Scharnhorst ordered but construction not started

Cruisers

Protected cruisers 

  (5,000 tons, 14 x 15 cm guns, 4 x 15 cm guns)
 
 
 Kaiserin Augusta class (6,000 tons, 4 x 15 cm guns)
 , 1892
  (5,700 tons, 2 x 21 cm guns, 8 x 15 cm guns)
 , 1897
 , 1897
 , 1897
 , 1897
 , 1898

Armored cruisers 

 Fürst Bismarck class (10,700 tons, 4 x 24 cm guns, 12 x 15 cm guns)
 , 1897
 Prinz Heinrich class (9,000 tons, 2 x 24 cm guns)
 , 1900
  (9,000 tons, 4 x 21 cm guns)
 , 1901
 , 1901
  (10,000 tons, 4 x 21 cm guns)
 , 1903
 , 1904
  (11,600 tons, 8 x 21 cm guns)
 , 1906
 , 1906
 Blücher class (15,800 tons, 12 x 21 cm guns)
 , 1908

Unprotected cruisers 

  (1,359 tons, 8 x 10.5 cm guns)
 , 1887
 , 1888
  (1,650 tons, 8 x 10.5 cm guns)
 , 1890
 , 1891
 , 1892
 , 1892
 , 1892
 , 1894
 Gefion class (3,700 tons, 10 x 10.5 cm guns)
 , 1893

Light cruisers

  (2,700 tons, 10 x 10.5 cm guns)
 , 1898
 
 
 
 
 
 
 
 
 , 1902
  (3,300 tons 10 x 10.5 cm guns, 2 x 15 cm guns)
 , 1903
 , 1903
 , 1903
 , 1904
 , 1904
 , 1905
 , 1905
  (1905) (3,400 tons 10 x 10.5 cm guns)
 , 1905
 , 1907
 , 1906
 , 1906
  (3,700 tons 10 x 10.5 cm guns)
 , 1907
 , 1908
  (4,400 tons 12 x 10.5 cm guns, 6 x 15 cm guns)
 , 1908
 , 1909
 , 1909
 , 1909
  (4,500 tons 12 x 10.5 cm guns, 7 x 15 cm guns)
 , 1911
 , 1911
 , 1911
 , 1911
  (4,900 tons 12 x 10.5 cm guns)
 , 1912
 , 1912
  (4,900 tons 12 x 10.5 cm guns, 7 x 15 cm guns)
 , 1913
 , 1914
  (4,400 tons 8 x 15 cm guns)
 , 1914
 , 1914
  (5,000 tons 8 x 15 cm guns)
 , 1915
 , 1915
  (1915) (5,400 tons 8 x 15 cm guns)
 , 1915
 , 1915
 , 1915
 , 1916
  (5,600 tons 8 x 15 cm guns)
 , 1916
 , 1917

Minelaying cruisers 

  (2,000 tons, 8 x 8.8 cm guns)
 , 1907
 , 1907
  (4,400 tons, 4 x 15 cm guns)
 , 1915
 , 1915

Aircraft carriers
 I class (12,585 tons, 23–29 aircraft)
 , 1915 passenger ship Ausonia and under conversion as naval vessel 1918, not completed and scrapped 1922

Auxilary minelayers
-2 × 37mm guns
-4 × 88mm guns, 2 × 50mm guns

Auxiliary warship
 SMS Graf von Goetzen, 1915 1,575 t [1 × 10.5 cm (4 in) gun; 1 × 8.8 cm (3 in) gun;2 × 37 mm revolver guns]

Avisos

 Zieten class (1,152 tons, 6 x 5 cm guns)
 , 1876
  (1,486 tons, 6 x 8.8 cm guns)
 , 1882
 , 1882
 Greif class (2,266 tons, 2 x 10.5 cm guns, 8 x 8.8 cm guns)
 , 1886
  (1,499 tons, 3 x 10.5 cm guns, 4 x 8.8 cm guns)
 , 1887
 , 1888
  (1,078 tons, 4 x 8.8 cm guns)
 , 1890
 , 1892
 Hela class (2,000 tons, 4 x 8.8 cm guns)
 , 1895

Gunboats

 

   (786 tons, 2 x 15 cm guns; 2 x 12 cm guns)
 , 1871
 , 1871
   (1,163 tons, 1 x 30.5 cm gun, 2 x 8.7 cm guns) 
 , 1876
 , 1876
 , 1876
 , 1877
 , 1877
 , 1878
 , 1878
 , 1879
 , 1880
 , 1880
 , 1881
   (1,050 tons, 2 x 10.5 cm guns, 4 x 8.8 cm guns) 
 , 1898
 , 1898
 , 1899
 , 1899
 , 1901
 , 1903

Corvettes 

 
 
 
 
 
 
 
 
 
 
 
 
 
  (3,386 tonnes, 16 x 15 cm L/22 guns)

Torpedo-boats and destroyers 

In the Imperial German Navy, there was no clear distinction between torpedo boats and torpedo boat destroyers, which were all numbered in the same series, the number being preceded by a letter that represented the building contractor. A new numbering series began in 1911; hence years of construction are appended in brackets below, to distinguish the two series.
 S90 class (1898–1907)
 
 SMS S91
 SMS S92
 SMS S93
 SMS S94
 SMS S95
 SMS S96
 SMS S97
 SMS S98
 SMS S99
 SMS S100
 SMS S101
 SMS S102
 SMS S103
 SMS S104
 SMS S105
 SMS S106
 SMS S107

 SMS G108
 SMS G109
 SMS G110
 SMS G111
 SMS G112
 
 SMS S114
 
 SMS S116
 SMS S117
 SMS S118
 
 SMS S120
 SMS S121
 SMS S122
 SMS S123
 SMS S124
 SMS S125
 SMS S126
 SMS S127
 SMS S128
 SMS S129
 SMS S130
 SMS S131
 SMS G132
 SMS G133
 SMS G134
 SMS G135
 SMS G136

 SMS G137 
 S138 class (1906–11)
 SMS G138
 SMS G139
 SMS G140
 SMS G141
 SMS G142
 SMS G143
 SMS G144
 SMS G145
 SMS G146
 SMS G147
 SMS G148
 SMS G149
 SMS V150
 SMS V151
 SMS V152
 SMS V153
 SMS V154
 SMS V155
 SMS V156
 SMS V157
 SMS V158
 SMS V159
 SMS V160
 SMS V161
 SMS V162
 SMS V163
 SMS V164
 SMS S165
 SMS S166
 SMS S167
 SMS S168
 SMS G169
 SMS G170
 SMS G171
 SMS G172
 SMS G173
 SMS G174
 SMS G175
 SMS S176
 SMS S177
 SMS S178
 SMS S179
 SMS V180
 SMS V181
 SMS V182
 SMS V183
 SMS V184
 SMS V185
 
 
 
 
 

 SMS G192
 SMS G193
 
 SMS G195
 
 SMS G197
 V1 class (1911–13)
 
 SMS V2
 SMS V3
 
 SMS V5
 SMS V6
 
 SMS G8
 SMS G9
 SMS G10
 SMS G11
 SMS G12
 SMS S13
 SMS S14
 SMS S15
 SMS S16
 SMS S17
 SMS S18
 SMS S19
 SMS S20
 SMS S21
 SMS S22
 SMS S23
 SMS S24
 V25 class (1913–15)
 
 SMS V26
 
 SMS V28
 SMS V29
 SMS V30
 
 
 
 
 
 
 
 
 
 
 
 
 SMS V43
 SMS V44
 
 
 
 
 SMS S49
 
 SMS S51
 SMS S52
 SMS S53
 SMS S54
 SMS S55
 SMS S56
 SMS S57
 SMS S58
 SMS S59
 SMS S60
 SMS S61
 SMS S62
 SMS S63
 SMS S64
 SMS S65
 SMS S66
 SMS V67
 SMS V68
 SMS V69
 SMS V70
 SMS V71
 SMS V72
 SMS V73
 SMS V74
 SMS V75
 SMS V76
 SMS V77
 SMS V78
 SMS V79
 SMS V80
 SMS V81
 SMS V82
 SMS V83
 SMS V84
 
 SMS G86
 SMS G87
 SMS G88
 SMS G89
 SMS G90
 SMS G91
 SMS G92
 SMS G93
 SMS G94
 SMS G95
B97 class
 SMS B97
 SMS B98
 SMS V99
 SMS V100
 SMS B109
 SMS B110
 SMS B111
 SMS B112
 G101 class
 SMS G101
 SMS G102
 SMS G103
 SMS G104
V105 class
 
 
 
 
 S113 class
 
 SMS S114
 SMS S115
 
 SMS V117
 SMS V118
 SMS V119
 SMS V120
 SMS V121
 SMS B122
 SMS B123
 SMS B124
 G96 class (1915–16)
 
 SMS V125
 SMS V126
 SMS V127
 SMS V128
 SMS V129
 SMS V130
 SMS V140
 SMS V141
 SMS V142
 SMS V143
 SMS V144
 SMS S131
 SMS S132
 SMS S133
 SMS S134
 SMS S135
 SMS S136
 SMS S137
 SMS S138
 SMS S139
 SMS H145
 SMS H146
 SMS H147
 SMS G148
 SMS G149
 SMS G150
 SMS WW151
 SMS S152 
 SMS S153
 SMS S154
 SMS S155
 SMS S156
 SMS S157
 SMS V158
 SMS V159
 SMS V160
 SMS V161
 SMS V162
 SMS V163
 SMS V164
 SMS V165
 SMS H166
 SMS H167
 SMS H168
 SMS H169
 V170 class (1918)
 SMS V170
 SMS V171
 SMS V172
 SMS V173
 SMS V174
 SMS V175
 SMS V176
 SMS V177
 SMS V203
 SMS V204
 SMS V205
 SMS V206
 SMS V207
 SMS V208
 SMS V209
 SMS V210
 SMS S178
 SMS S179
 SMS S180
 SMS S181
 SMS S182
 SMS S183
 SMS S184
 SMS S185
 SMS S211
 SMS S212
 SMS S213
 SMS S214
 SMS S215
 SMS S216
 SMS S217
 SMS S218
 SMS S219
 SMS S220
 SMS S221
 SMS S222
 SMS S223
 SMS H186
 SMS H187
 SMS H188
 SMS H189
 SMS H190
 SMS H191
 SMS H192
 SMS H193
 SMS H194
 SMS H195
 SMS H196
 SMS H197
 SMS H198
 SMS H199
 SMS H200
 SMS H201
 SMS H202

Survey Ships

Tankers

See also 
 List of naval ships of Germany

References 

Imperial Navy
 List